Qi Lili (born ) is a Chinese female volleyball player and coach. She was part of the China women's national volleyball team.

She participated at the 1990 FIVB Volleyball Women's World Championship and 1994 FIVB Volleyball Women's World Championship in Brazil. On club level she played with Zhejiang.

Clubs
  Zhejiang (1994)

References

External links
http://u18.women.2015.volleyball.fivb.com/en/competition/teams/chn-china

1971 births
Living people
Chinese women's volleyball players
Place of birth missing (living people)
Asian Games medalists in volleyball
Volleyball players at the 1990 Asian Games
Volleyball players at the 1994 Asian Games
Medalists at the 1990 Asian Games
Medalists at the 1994 Asian Games
Asian Games gold medalists for China
Asian Games silver medalists for China
20th-century Chinese women